The Clemence–Irons House (also known as the Edward Manton House) is a historic house located in Johnston, Rhode Island. It was built by Richard Clemence in 1691 and is a rare surviving example of a "stone ender", a building type first developed in the western part of England and common in colonial Rhode Island. The house is listed on the National Register of Historic Places, and is a historic house museum owned and operated by Historic New England. It is open Saturdays between June and mid-October.

History

Richard Clemence, a farmer, constructed the Clemence–Irons House in 1691. Passing through a series of owners in the 18th, 19th, and 20th centuries, the house had grown to 13 rooms by 1938, when it was purchased by Henry Sharpe and his sisters, Ellen Sharpe and Louisa Sharpe Metcalf. Additions by this time included a one-story parlor with a separate fireplace at the north end, a second lean-to with kitchen, bath and stair hall and two bedrooms, a one-story ell at the southwest corner, and a front hall and porch at the southeast corner.

Nonetheless, the Sharpe family valued the age and recognized the stone-ender characteristics of the house. It commissioned Norman Isham, who had directed restoration efforts at nearby Eleazer Arnold House in 1920, to investigate the structure and restore the house to its 17th-century appearance.

Isham determined that the original house consisted of one-and-a-half stories with a rear lean-to and a steep gable roof. In the plan, he found evidence of four rooms on the first floor instead of the more typical one-room plan of other early stone-enders. Removing the later additions and baring the main block of non-original interior finishes, the house was rebuilt to reflect Isham's findings.

The plan consists of a great room and chamber in the main block, with a kitchen and second smaller chamber in the rear lean-to. Using a combination of salvaged and new materials to recreate the original appearance of the house, Isham also commissioned furnishings made from old wood to complement the architectural reconstruction.

Significant as one of the oldest houses in Rhode Island, the Clemence–Irons House also is important as a record of mid-20th-century restoration ideas and methods. The house was donated to the Society for the Preservation of New England Antiquities, now known as Historic New England, in 1947. In 2003 a dendrochronology survey of the tree rings determined a 1691 construction date. Together with the Eleazer Arnold House, the Clemence–Irons House provides a rare opportunity to study the stone-ender in New England.

See also 
 List of the oldest buildings in Rhode Island
 Eleazer Arnold House, another nearby Rhode Island stone-ender owned by Historic New England
 National Register of Historic Places in Providence County, Rhode Island

References

External links

Historic New England website information
Photograph from MIT
Video of House

Houses completed in 1691
History of New England
Houses on the National Register of Historic Places in Rhode Island
Museums in Providence County, Rhode Island
Historic house museums in Rhode Island
Historic American Buildings Survey in Rhode Island
Buildings and structures in Johnston, Rhode Island
Historic New England
Houses in Providence County, Rhode Island
1691 establishments in Rhode Island